Raffaele Agostino De Ferrari (Genoa, 20 July 1732 - Genoa, 17 January 1801) was the 180th Doge of the Republic of Genoa.

Biography 
On 4 July 1787, the Grand Council elected him to lead the Genoese state, the one hundred and thirty-fifth in two-year succession and the one hundred and eighty in republican history. During his mandate there was the fortunate capture, on 11 August 1788, in the waters in front of the town of Bordighera, of an Algerian Xebec, of the 117 Turkish sailors taken prisoner by the Genoese galleys San Giorgio and Raggio, 50 were killed. The dogal two-year period ended on July 4, 1789. In private life he married Settimia Spinola. His nephew Raffaele de Ferrari was the husband of the Marquise Maria Brignole Sale De Ferrari. Raffaele Agostino De Ferrari died in Genoa in 1801.

See also 

 Republic of Genoa
 Doge of Genoa

References 

18th-century Doges of Genoa
1732 births
1801 deaths